The 2017–18 PGA Tour was the 103rd season of the PGA Tour, and the 51st since separating from the PGA of America. The season began on October 5, 2017.

Changes for 2017–18
The schedule contained 48 events, including two new ones: The CJ Cup in South Korea and the Corales Puntacana Resort and Club Championship, a former event on the Web.com Tour based out of the Dominican Republic. The Barbasol Championship was played in Kentucky, the first non-major PGA Tour event in the state since 1959. The Puerto Rico Open became an unofficial charity event in the wake of Hurricane Maria.

Schedule 
The following table lists official events during the 2017–18 season.

Unofficial events
The following events were sanctioned by the PGA Tour, but did not carry FedEx Cup points or official money, nor were wins official.

Location of tournaments

Money leaders
The money list was based on prize money won during the season, calculated in U.S. dollars.

Awards

See also
2017 in golf
2018 in golf
2018 Web.com Tour
2018 PGA Tour Champions season
2018 European Tour

Notes

References

External links
Official site

2018
2017 in golf
2018 in golf